The Sutton County Courthouse, on Public Square in Sonora, Texas, was built in 1891.  It was listed on the National Register of Historic Places in 1977.

It was designed in Second Empire style by architect Oscar Ruffini.

It is a Texas State Antiquities Landmark and a Recorded Texas Historic Landmark.

See also

National Register of Historic Places listings in Sutton County, Texas
Recorded Texas Historic Landmarks in Sutton County
List of county courthouses in Texas

References

External links

Courthouses in Texas
Courthouses on the National Register of Historic Places in Texas
National Register of Historic Places in Sutton County, Texas
Second Empire architecture in Texas
Government buildings completed in 1891